This is a list of the mammal species recorded in the Bahamas. Of the mammal species in the Bahamas, two are endangered, three are vulnerable, and one is considered to be extinct.

The following tags are used to highlight each species' conservation status as assessed by the International Union for Conservation of Nature:

Order: Sirenia (manatees and dugongs) 

Sirenia is an order of fully aquatic, herbivorous mammals that inhabit rivers, estuaries, coastal marine waters, swamps, and marine wetlands. All four species are endangered.

Family: Trichechidae
Genus: Trichechus
 West Indian manatee, T. manatus

Order: Rodentia (rodents) 

Rodents make up the largest order of mammals, with over 40% of mammalian species. They have two incisors in the upper and lower jaw which grow continually and must be kept short by gnawing. Most rodents are small though the capybara can weigh up to 45 kg (100 lb).

Suborder: Hystricomorpha
Family: Capromyidae
Subfamily: Capromyinae
Genus: Geocapromys
 Bahamian hutia, G. ingrahami 
Family: Muridae
Subfamily: Murinae
Genus: Rattus
 Black rat, R. rattus  introduced

Order: Chiroptera (bats) 

The bats' most distinguishing feature is that their forelimbs are developed as wings, making them the only mammals capable of flight. Bat species account for about 20% of all mammals.

Family: Noctilionidae
Genus: Noctilio
 Greater bulldog bat, N. leporinus 
Family: Vespertilionidae
Subfamily: Vespertilioninae
Genus: Eptesicus
 Big brown bat, E. fuscus 
Genus: Lasiurus
 Minor red bat, L. minor 
Family: Molossidae
Genus: Tadarida
 Mexican free-tailed bat, T. brasiliensis 
Family: Phyllostomidae
Subfamily: Phyllostominae
Genus: Macrotus
 Waterhouse's leaf-nosed bat, M. waterhousii 
Subfamily: Brachyphyllinae
Genus: Brachyphylla
 Cuban fruit-eating bat, B. nana  extirpated
Subfamily: Phyllonycterinae
Genus: Erophylla
 Buffy flower bat, E. sezekorni 
Subfamily: Glossophaginae
Genus: Monophyllus
 Leach's single leaf bat, M. redmani 
Subfamily: Stenodermatinae
Genus: Artibeus
 Jamaican fruit bat, A. jamaicensis 
Family: Natalidae
Genus: Chilonatalus
 Bahaman funnel-eared bat, C. tumidifrons 
Genus: Nyctiellus
 Gervais's funnel-eared bat, N. lepidus

Order: Cetacea (whales) 

The order Cetacea includes whales, dolphins and porpoises. They are the mammals most fully adapted to aquatic life with a spindle-shaped nearly hairless body, protected by a thick layer of blubber, and forelimbs and tail modified to provide propulsion underwater.

Suborder: Mysticeti
Family: Balaenopteridae (baleen whales)
Genus: Eubalaena
 North Atlantic right whale, E. glacialis 
Genus: Balaenoptera 
 Common minke whale, Balaenoptera acutorostrata
 Sei whale, Balaenoptera borealis
 Bryde's whale, Balaenoptera brydei
 Blue whale, Balaenoptera musculus
 Fin whale, Balaenoptera physalus
Genus: Megaptera
 Humpback whale, Megaptera novaeangliae
Suborder: Odontoceti
Superfamily: Platanistoidea
Family: Delphinidae (marine dolphins)
Genus: Delphinus
 Short-beaked common dolphin, Delphinus delphis DD
Genus: Feresa
 Pygmy killer whale, Feresa attenuata DD
Genus: Globicephala
 Short-finned pilot whale, Globicephala macrorhyncus DD
Genus: Lagenodelphis
 Fraser's dolphin, Lagenodelphis hosei DD
Genus: Grampus
 Risso's dolphin, Grampus griseus DD
Genus: Orcinus
 Killer whale, Orcinus orca DD
Genus: Peponocephala
 Melon-headed whale, Peponocephala electra DD
Genus: Pseudorca
 False killer whale, Pseudorca crassidens DD
Genus: Stenella
 Pantropical spotted dolphin, Stenella attenuata DD
 Clymene dolphin, Stenella clymene DD
 Striped dolphin, Stenella coeruleoalba DD
 Atlantic spotted dolphin, Stenella frontalis DD
 Spinner dolphin, Stenella longirostris DD
Genus: Steno
 Rough-toothed dolphin, Steno bredanensis DD
Genus: Tursiops
 Common bottlenose dolphin, Tursiops truncatus
Family: Physeteridae (sperm whales)
Genus: Physeter
 Sperm whale, Physeter catodon DD
Family: Kogiidae (dwarf sperm whales)
Genus: Kogia
 Pygmy sperm whale, Kogia breviceps DD
 Dwarf sperm whale, Kogia sima DD
Superfamily Ziphioidea
Family: Ziphidae (beaked whales)
Genus: Mesoplodon
 Gervais' beaked whale, Mesoplodon europaeus DD
 Blainville's beaked whale, Mesoplodon densirostris DD
 True's beaked whale, Mesoplodon mirus DD
Genus: Ziphius
 Cuvier's beaked whale, Ziphius cavirostris DD

Order: Carnivora (carnivorans) 

There are over 260 species of carnivorans, the majority of which feed primarily on meat. They have a characteristic skull shape and dentition.

Suborder: Caniformia
Family: Procyonidae (raccoons)
Genus: Procyon
 Raccoon, P. lotor  introduced
 Bahamian raccoon, P. l. maynardi introduced
Family: Phocidae (earless seals)
Genus: Cystophora
Hooded seal, C. cristata  vagrant
Genus: Neomonachus
 Caribbean monk seal, N. tropicalis

See also
List of chordate orders
Lists of mammals by region
List of prehistoric mammals
Mammal classification
List of mammals described in the 2000s

Notes

References
 

Bahamas
Mammals

Bahamas